Terruggia is a comune (municipality) in the Province of Alessandria in the Italian region Piedmont, located about  east of Turin and about  northwest of Alessandria.

Terruggia borders the following municipalities: Casale Monferrato and Rosignano Monferrato.

Demographic evolution

References

Cities and towns in Piedmont